Vadim Galeyev (born 7 February 1992) is a Kazakh cyclist, who last rode for UCI Continental team .

Major results

2014
 1st  Road race, Asian Under-23 Road Championships
 1st Stage 2 Tour de Bretagne
 4th Overall Tour of China II
1st Stage 3
2015
 9th Sochi Cup
2016
 6th Grand Prix of Vinnytsia
 7th Grand Prix of ISD
2018
 7th Race Horizon Park Classic
 8th Overall Tour of Mediterrennean

References

External links

1992 births
Living people
Kazakhstani male cyclists
People from Petropavl